Clarence William Hennan (May 24, 1894 – February 28, 1956) was an internationally recognized philatelist known for his collection, his exhibits at various stamp exhibitions, and for his expertise in evaluating the authenticity of rare stamps.

Philatelic literature
Hennan authored various articles and books on specific aspects of philately. These include:
 Haiti: Postal History and Stamps (a series published over a 3-year period)
 Curaçao Specialized (book published in 1952)

Collection interests
Dr. Hennan had various collections from which he authored philatelic articles. Today he is remembered for his:
 Chicago Postal History Collection

Philatelic leadership
Dr. Hennan provided leadership in the philatelic field in various ways:
 President of the American Philatelic Congress
 President of the American Philatelic Society
 President of the Collectors Club of Chicago
 Various positions in the Chicago Philatelic Society (Honorary Life Member)

Awards
For his leadership and accomplishments in the field of philately, Dr. Hennan was:
 given the Newbury Award in 1951
 given the Lichtenstein Medal in 1953
 named to the Roll of Distinguished Philatelists in 1956.

See also
 Philately
 Philatelic literature
 Lichtenstein Medal
 Clarence William Hennan
 Collectors Club of New York

American philatelists
Philatelic literature
1894 births
1956 deaths
People from Chicago
Signatories to the Roll of Distinguished Philatelists